Kadri Hinrikus (born 22 June 1970) is an Estonian children's writer and journalist.

She has graduated from Tallinn University in theatre direction.

She has been an editor and news anchor for Estonian national television (Eesti Televisioon). She is working as an editor for children’s magazine Täheke.

She has written several children's books. Her works were featured in the White Ravens catalogue in 2013 and 2016.

References

Living people
1970 births
Estonian women journalists
Estonian children's writers
Estonian editors
Estonian women children's writers
Estonian women editors
Estonian magazine editors
Women magazine editors
Tallinn University alumni
21st-century Estonian women writers